= Miluše =

Miluše is a female given name. The name is an Old Czech variant of Milota. Milena is a Czech nickname for Miloslava meaning dear, darling. It is pronounced MIL-uw-sheh.

== Name Days ==
- Czech: 3 August

== Name variants ==
- Miluša (Slovak)

== Famous bearers ==
- Miluše Šplechtová, Czech actress
- Miluška Voborníková, Czech actress
